Pilvai  is a village in Mehsana district in the state of Gujarat. Pilvai (Pin 382850) is located in Vijapur county and connected to Mehsana, Himatnagar, Gandhinagar and  Ahmedabad by road. Ahmedabad international Airport is approximately 60 km (37 miles) from Pilvai. Pilvai has several educational institutes.

Pilvai have seven subdivision villages: Pilvai proper, Patelpura (Pilvai), Veda (Pilvai), Fatepura (Pilvai), Ramnagar (Pilvai), Khanusha (Pilvai), and Kotadi (Pilvai).Vishwakarma temple belonging to Suthar community is a very old temple in the village.

Education
 Patelpura - primary school 
 Kumar Shala - Primary School
 Kanya Shala - Girls School
 Saint Mary's School - English-medium Catholic school
 ST Mary's High School (Gujarati Medium)
 Sheth G C High School 
 PTC College, Pilvai 
 Dr Vadilal Ravchand Shah B Ed College, Pilvai managed by Uttar-Purva Gujarat Uchcha Kelavani Mandal, Pilvai
 Shri N R Raval Industrial Training Institute, Pilvai managed by Uttar-Purva Gujarat Uchcha Kelavani Mandal, Pilvai
 Shri U P Arts, Smt M G Panchal Science and Shri V L Shah Commerce College also known as Pilvai College managed by Uttar-Purva Gujarat Uchcha Kelavani Mandal, PILVAI and affiliated with  Hemchandracharya - North Gujarat University an accredited State University Pilvai College was established in 1960 under guidance from Ramchandra Amin, Chagan Bha Patel, Dr. A K Patel, Gangaram Raval and Motibhai Chaudhary. Pilvai College is affiliated with Hemchandracharya North Gujarat University, Patan, Gujarat. The college is re-accredited by NAAC with A+ Grade (CGPA-3.45) in third Cycle. The college is awarded prestigious CPE Status (2nd Phase) by UGC. The college is also accredited with A Grade (CGPA-3.04) by KCG, Gujarat Government. The State Goveronment also recognized this institute as best college in online teaching on Teachers Day. In GSIRF rating the college has got 4-Star among all colleges of Gujarat. Dr Sanjay Shah is the principal of this College.
 Agriculture Research Center
 Prathmik Arogya Kender (Govt Hospital)

Temples
Rushivan Shant samdhi Dham, Pilvai
Ambaji Temple
Ashapura Desh
Devi Temple (Vihol's Kuldevi)
Bhavani Ma Temple
Hanuman Temple
Jain Derasar
Jalwara Mahadev
Jethariya Mahadev
Lord Swaminarayana Temple
Mahakali Temple
Narmadeshwar Mahadev
Ramji Mandir (Meravat vas)
Ranchhod Ray Temple
Ranchhod Ray Temple vasai (dabhla)  
Ratneshwari Mata Temple Patel Pura
Vishwakarma Dada Temple (Suthar vas)

Notable people
 Anandiben Patel, First woman Chief Minister of Gujarat state. She is the first female science student of Pilvai college.

Festival
Makar Sakranti, Uttarayan or Kite Flying Day, is the biggest festival in Pilvai typically celebrated on 14 January each year. Everybody has time off from work. Schools and colleges are closed for this special holiday. The winter is about to finish and the sunny spring and summer approach. Local celebration begins with feeding sacred animals including street dogs in the early morning, chanting holy Bhajan in the streets and praying for peace and welfare for the world. People fly colorful fighter kites in the sky and, if it is sunny, spend the day in the street or on the roof. People enjoy a special lunch including Undhiyu and Jalebi.

References

External links
 Google Map of Pilvai, Gujarat
 Weather in Pilvai

Villages in Mehsana district